Thryssa mystax, the moustached thryssa or Gangetic anchovy, is a species of oceanodromous ray-finned fish in the family Engraulidae. It is found in the tropical western Indo-Pacific region from India, Sri Lanka to Myanmar and south to Java, and Indonesia.

It is a small schooling fish found in depth of 0-50m. Maximum length do not exceed 15.5 cm. The fish has 11 to 12 dorsal soft rays and only present 29 to 37 anal soft rays. There are 24 to 32 keeled scutes from isthmus to anus on belly region. Lower gill rakers are serrated. Body is silver, darker dorsally. There is a distinctive dark blotch behind upper part of gill opening, which can easily identify the species from other Thryssa species. Caudal fin is yellowish. It feeds on planktons, fish larva, and small crustaceans like shrimp larva.

References

Fish of Thailand
Taxa named by Marcus Elieser Bloch
Taxa named by Johann Gottlob Theaenus Schneider
Fish described in 1801
mystax